The Job is an independent darkly comic drama written and directed by Shem Bitterman based on his 1998 play. The film world premiered  on September 26, 2009, at the San Diego Film Festival where writer Shem Bitterman won a Best Screenplay award.

Plot
A hapless man named Bubba, who is desperate to find a job and marry the woman he loves, is hooked up with a slick employment agent by a drifter. Only after agreeing to the job (a contract kill, no less), Bubba finds himself in over his head.

Cast
Patrick Flueger as Bubba
Taryn Manning as Joy
Ron Perlman as Jim 
Joe Pantoliano as Perriman
Katie Lowes as Connie

Production
Filming began on 6 May 2008 in Detroit, and ended in July 2008.

Release
After a very brief limited release, the film was released on DVD on 27 July 2010.

The film is available on Amazon. Free to Amazon Prime members.

References

External links

American black comedy films
2009 comedy-drama films
American independent films
2009 films
2000s English-language films
Films shot in Michigan
2009 independent films
2000s American films